Slapstick is a compilation of most songs recorded by Chicago ska-punk band Slapstick. It was released by Asian Man Records in 1997.  Tracks 7-20 were originally located on Slapstick's only full-length album, Lookit! Tracks 1-6 were planned to be on
their 2nd album and released on Hellcat Records, but the band broke up prior to recording enough songs for a full length.

Track listing
 "There's a Metalhead in the Parking Lot" - 2:29
 "The Park" - 2:15
 "Eighteen" - 2:34
 "What I Learned" - 1:17
 "February One" - 1:39
 "Sick of This Place" - 2:05
 "Good Times Gone" - 1:27
 "Almost Punk Enough" - 1:52
 "Cheat to Win" - 2:06
 "Crooked" - 1:47
 "Colorado" - 1:34
 "74 Fullerton" - 2:24
 "She Doesn't Love Me" - 2:13
 "My Way" - 2:15
 "The Geek" - 2:47
 "Not Tonight" - 1:07
 "Ed" - 2:05
 "The Punks" - 1:59
 "Nate B." - 3:01
 "Broken Down" - 2:36
 "Johnny" - 3:31
 "Wake Up Stanley" - 2:14
 "My Only Friend" - 2:59
 "Earth Angel" (The Penguins cover) - 2:21
 "Alternative Radio" - 1:31

References 

1997 compilation albums
Slapstick (band) albums
Asian Man Records compilation albums